Van Bergen House is a historic home located at New Baltimore in Greene County, New York.  It was built about 1786 (expanded about 1820) and is a two-story, four by five bay stubblestone residence with a slate-clad hipped roof.  It was restored in the mid-20th century.  Also on the property is a smoke house.

It was listed on the National Register of Historic Places in 1991.

References

Houses on the National Register of Historic Places in New York (state)
Federal architecture in New York (state)
Neoclassical architecture in New York (state)
Houses completed in 1786
Houses in Greene County, New York
National Register of Historic Places in Greene County, New York